The School for Advanced Studies (SAS) is a SACS accredited dual-enrollment secondary school in Miami, Florida. It is a part of the Miami-Dade County Public Schools System and is located at five campuses of Miami Dade College: the Kendall campus, North campus, Wolfson campus, West, and Homestead campus.

Demographics
SAS is 61% Hispanic, 16% Black, 16% White non-Hispanic, and 5% Asian.

Awards and honors
Ranked #6 out of the top 2000 public senior high schools in the U.S. in a joint report by Newsweek and The Daily Beast  in 2013, 2nd out of all Florida schools, and 1st out of all Miami schools
7 May 2013 was declared as SAS Day in Miami-Dade County, signifying the 25-year anniversary of this nationally recognized high school.
Ranked #12 out of 30,000+ public senior high schools in the U.S. by Newsweek in 2012, and 3rd out of all Florida schools on the list
Ranked #46 out of 30,000+ public senior high schools in the U.S. by Newsweek in 2010, and 10th out of all Florida schools on the list
Nominated for South Florida's Top Research Program in 2016

See also
 Academy for Advanced Academics

References

External links 
 

High schools in Miami-Dade County, Florida
Public high schools in Florida
Miami-Dade County Public Schools
Magnet schools in Florida
1988 establishments in Florida
Educational institutions established in 1988